Jerez Peak is the ice-covered peak rising to 1400 m at the south extremity of Ravelin Ridge on Clarence Island in the South Shetland Islands, Antarctica.  It is connected to Mount Llana by Soyka Saddle, and surmounts Treskavets Glacier to the northeast and Highton Glacier to the southeast.

The peak is named after the Spanish mariner Gregorio Jerez who made the second sighting of Roché Island (South Georgia, named by him Isla San Pedro) in 1756.

Location
British mapping in 1972 and 2009.

Maps
British Antarctic Territory. Scale 1:200000 topographic map. DOS 610 Series, Sheet W 61 54. Directorate of Overseas Surveys, Tolworth, UK, 1972.
South Shetland Islands: Elephant, Clarence and Gibbs Islands. Scale 1:220000 topographic map. UK Antarctic Place-names Committee, 2009.
 Antarctic Digital Database (ADD). Scale 1:250000 topographic map of Antarctica. Scientific Committee on Antarctic Research (SCAR). Since 1993, regularly upgraded and updated.

References
 Bulgarian Antarctic Gazetteer. Antarctic Place-names Commission. (details in Bulgarian, basic data in English)
 Jerez Peak. SCAR Composite Gazetteer of Antarctica.

External links
 Jerez Peak. Copernix satellite image

Mountains of the South Shetland Islands
Bulgaria and the Antarctic